Kim Bu-sik, or Gim Busik (1075–1151) was a Korean calligrapher, military general, philosopher, poet, and politician during the Goryeo period. He was a scion of the Silla royalty and a member of the Gyeongju Kim clan. Later he was the supreme chancellor from 1136 to 1142 and was in charge of suppression of the Myocheong rebellion. Kim is best known for supervising the compilation of the Samguk Sagi, the oldest extant written Korean history.

Early life and background
The Gyeongju Kim clan was a direct descendant of the last Silla king, Kim Pu. The clan seat (bongwan) name derives from Kim’s great grandfather, a member of the royal Kim clan, who became the administrator in charge of the former Silla capital (renamed Gyeongju at the beginning of the Goryeo period). The first Goryeo king Taejo married into the Gyeongju Kim, and the clan played a leading role in early Goryeo politics. Three of its members were the officials of the first and second rank during 981-1069.

Kim’s father Kim Kun was an official (reached the junior 3rd rank) and a famous poet. When he was a member of an embassy to the Song court, he and the fellow envoy Pak Illyang published a collection of poems that made a deep impression on Song
scholars. "The allusions in the poems were so intricate that the most renowned
court scholars had to study them in detail before being able to
understand them."

The oldest son Kim Bu-pil (? -?) reached the senior 5th rank in 1102, but these were the three younger sons, Kim Bu-il (1071–1132), Kim Busik, and Kim Bu-cheol, also known as Kim Puǔi, (1079-1136) that played an important role in politics and culture of Goryeo. Kim Kun died when Gim Busik was about thirteen, and his widow raised and supervised the education of her younger sons. Later King Yejong rewarded her with a yearly allowance, noting in particular her merit in
assisting each of her sons to pass the state examination.

Career

Early career, 1096-1122 

Kim himself passed the civil service examination in 1096 on the Book of Documents  and was appointed as an official in the Anseo prefecture. Subsequently he was selected for a position at the Hallimwon (Academy of Letters), that was also responsible for drafting foreign correspondence. The Kim brothers steadily raised through the ranks of the civil service. In 1115 Kim Busik was appointed to the Office of Remonstrance. Despite their relatively junior ranks, both Kim Busik  (senior 6th rank) and Kim Bu-il (junior 5th rank) participated in the meetings of the Privy Council (Chae Chu).

The increasing literary and scholarly reputation of the Kim brothers made them popular lecturers on the Confucian classics. In 1116, King Yejong instituted the royal lecture (kyeongyeon) by designating a lecture hall and making a number of appointments to the position of a royal lecturer. Under him and his successor Injong the lectures were held regularly. Such a lecture was a Confucian ritual in which the ruler paid homage to Confucian teachings. Many of the royal lecturers belonged to the Han An-in faction that opposed Yi Ja-gyeom. Both Kim Bu-cheol and Kim Busik delivered royal lectures, expounding the teachings of Confucius and Mencius. Kim Busik lectured on the Book of History and the Book of Changes.

These lectures became a scene of rivalry between Kim Busik and Yun Oni, son of the famous general Yun Gwan. Yun was an influential Confucian scholar and a future supporter of the Pyongyang faction and Myo Cheong. His attacks on Kim may have roots in Yun Gwan's fall and disgrace (1108-1109) that was at least partially precipitated by the court machinations, or in an incident when Kim Busik rewrote a memorial plaque written by the general. During Kim’s lessons on various historical topics Yun Oni posed difficult questions, apparently trying to embarrass him and discredit his scholarship. After 1121 Kim Busik was appointed as Royal Diarist, or ji, to the court of Yejong. By 1122 Kim Busik became an executive at the Ministry of Rites (Yebu Sirang), typically an appointment of the 3rd junior rank.

Role in the foreign policy, 1114-1122 

The years 1114-1128 saw a major change in the balance of power in North-East Asia. Around the year 1100 the dominant regional power was the Khitan state of Liao. Emperors of Liao and of Song China were officially considered equals. However, Song had to pay an annual tribute (that was not named as such) of 200,000 taels of silver and 300,000 bolts of silk, that was equivalent to several percent of the Song government revenues. Goryeo was a vassal state of Liao, even if the tribute was not paid after 1054. Jurchen tribes were vassals of Liao, that exercised a variable degree of control over their tribal groupings. Jurchen  had complicated relationships with Goryeo. These ranged from a tributary status and mercenary service to cross-border warfare and informal alliances, particularly during the reign of King Yejong.

Basic tenets of Goryeo’s political theory were expressed in the Ten Injunctions of Taejo. This document advised a cautious following of the Chinese practices, and expressed abhorrence of Khitan, and by extension, other nomadic "barbarians". The status of Goryeo rulers can be roughly summarized as naeje oewang (emperor at home and king abroad). They were titled kings, were vassals of Khitan Liao dynasty, and were careful to keep these conventions in the correspondence with the suzerains. On the other hand, many aspects of the government were fashioned after following the imperial conventions. A majority view of the scholars-officials, including the Kim brothers, was that Goryeo was a realm in itself and thus “a possible center of the world”. During this period Kim Busik drafted a significant portion of the diplomatic correspondence with both Liao and Song.

Throughout their careers Kim brothers demonstrated a pragmatic approach both domestically and internationally. At the beginning of the century the Liao Dynasty appeared strong and Kim Bu-il congratulated Emperor Tianzuo of Liao  as a ruler who “developed and enlarged [his] territory and made both Chinese and barbarians follow [him] peacefully." In a letter to the Song court Kim Busik derived the Goryeo legitimacy as successors of Jizi (Giji, a semi-legendary sage who is said to have ruled Gojoseon in the 11th century BCE),  who was enfeoffed by the Chinese Son of Heaven. After a long and mutually complementary discourse Busik "concluded by stating that it was the barbarians who stood between Goryeo and
the Song, literally and figuratively." This letter was written just before Kim Busik finally ensured the recognition by Goryeo of the Jin dynasty ruler as the Son of Heaven in 1126.

Jurchen  leader Wanyan Aguda started a successful rebellion against Liao in 1114. While a majority of the Goryeo officials were anti-Jurchen, both the king's father-in-law Yi Ja-gyeom and Kim Busik aimed to keep Goryeo out of the fray and benefit from the changing geopolitical situation. For example, the first Liao request for help was debated (8th month of the 10th year of Yejong’s reign, July 1115) at the extended meeting of the Privy Council that included also the top military commanders. The majority of officials supported sending the troops. The opposition was voiced by a relatively junior associate of Yi Ja-gyeom and by Kim Bu-il and Kim Busik, who argued that `sending troops for another country could be the cause of trouble and would undoubtedly be dangerous for the future’. They succeeded in stalling the motion. At approximately the same time Kim Busik acknowledged the increasing strength of the Jurchen in the official letters to the Liao court, but swore that Goryeo was loyal to Liao; if not, “may the gods destroy it”.

Wanyan Aguda scored a number of victories over Liao; and proclaimed the establishment of the Jin dynasty with himself as its first emperor in 1115.  In 1116-1117 Kim Busik was part of the embassy to the Song court. Goryeo consistently refused any military help to Liao and in the wake of the Jurchen advances recaptured the Uiju (Poju) area and once again established the Yalu River as its border. While the majority of Yenjong’s officials believed in the eventual Liao downfall, a crisis in the relationship with the Jurchen was precipitated by the request of Taizu of Jin to be recognized as the ‘elder brother’ of the Goryeo king in 1117. A majority of the officials opposed this request and even considered beheading the envoy. The factions of Yi Cha-gyeom and Kim Busik factions stalled the rash moves, but the formal submission of Goryeo to Jin was made only during the reign of Injong.

In fact, Kim Bu-cheol (voicing a position of Kim Busik who was at the time in China) submitted a memorandum proposing to accede to the demands of Emperor Taizu of Jin, giving the following rational: “Now even the great Song calls itself the younger brother of the Khitan and they have gotten along peacefully for generations. And although there is nothing under heaven that can measure up to the dignity of the Son of Heaven [of Goryeo], submitting to and obeying the barbarians like this is the proper policy, one that the sages called ‘the temporarily putting aside of one’s principles as circumstances demand it’ and ‘the protection of the whole country.’" Later Kim Busik himself provided an example of temporizing in the correspondence with the Jin, arguing why Goryeo cannot be its vassal.

In his book Gaoli tujing Xu Jing (1091-1153), a member of the Song mission to Goryeo in 1122-1123, mentions Kim Busik.

Reign of Injong (1122-1146)

Early years of the reign of Injong (1122-1126) were dominated by Yi Cha-gyeom, his maternal grandfather.  Shortly after Injong took the throne, Kim was an executive, and in 1124 was promoted to the position of the fourth secretary in the Ministry of Rites (Yebu Sirang). Using his position Kim opposed Yi Ja-gyeom hold on power, aiming at Yi's attempts to enhance his public image. Already in 1122 Kim argued against giving special recognition to Yi Ja-gyeom as king’s grandfather. Later he questioned the appropriateness of calling Yi’s birthday Insujel (Celebrating Humaneness and Longevity), and a planned performance of the ritual music at the Yi’s family graves. Nevertheless, after a failed coup against Yi in early 1126 Kim Busik not only remained in power, but was promoted to the position of the Chief Censor. 

The role of Kim Busik in toppling Yi Ja-gyeom is unknown. Kim Bu-il, on the other hand, was one of the intermediaries between Injong and  Yi‘s military supporters, inducing them to defect.

After 1126 the Kim brothers advanced through the Security Council into the highest offices. 

In 1135-1136 Kim Busik was in charge of suppressing the rebellion of Myo Cheong and rooting out his adherents in Kaesong. He became the supreme chancellor in 1136 and dominated the Goryeo government till his official retirement in 1142.

In 1142, Injong ordered the compilation of the Samguk Sagi, a chronicle of events in the Three Kingdoms and Unified Silla. Using Chinese histories (particularly Shiji by Sima Qian), Kim Busik at the head of the fourteen-author team compiled the oldest extant source on Korean history. It was submitted to Injong in late 1145 or early 1146.

Works 
Samguk Sagi (“The History of the Three Kingdoms of Korea”) is the oldest extant work of Korean history and often the only written source of information about the Three kingdoms and Unified Silla periods

Religion 
The ideological and religious opinions of Kim Busik fell into  the spectrum of practices of the upper strata of the Goryeo society.  Confucianism was primarily a state ideology, aimed at social cohesion and state administration. Kim was one of the most prominent Confucian scholars of his time.

By the twelfth century Buddhism was a religion of both elites and common people. It enjoyed royal and aristocratic patronage and the Buddhist hierarchy was integrated into the state bureaucracy. Kim Busik was a practicing Buddhist. He established a family temple complex Kwallan-sa. This temple also inspired Kim's poem At Kwallan. Kim is an author of the inscription honoring a Buddhist monk Uicheon (the son of   King Munjong and the National Preceptor, one of the three highest Buddhist hierarchs of the country). There he recalls their only meeting, when as a boy he visited his brother in a monastery. In retirement Kim became a lay monk (keosa). 

Worship of native spirits and guardian spirits was widely practiced by populace and part of the royal rituals prescribed by the Ten Injunctions of Taejo. During the Myo Cheong rebellion in 1135-1136 Kim Busik is recorded as swearing an oath “by the heaven and the earth, the mountains and streams and the gods and spirits”. He made a sacrifice to the guardian deities of the Western Capital following its capture from the rebels.

Family
Father: Gim-Geun (김근, 金覲)
Grandfather: Gim Won-chung (김원충, 金元冲)
Older brother: Gim Bu-pil (김부필, 金富弼)
Older brother: Gim Bu-il (김부일, 金副佾; 1071–1123)
Younger brother: Gim Bu-ui (김부의, 金副儀)
Unnamed wife
1st son: Gim Don-jung (김돈중, 金敦中; 1119–1170)
Grandson: Gim Gun-su (김군수, 金君綏)
2nd son: Gim Don-si (김돈시, 金敦時; d. 1170)

References

Sources
 
 

1075 births
1151 deaths
11th-century Korean calligraphers
11th-century Korean philosophers
12th-century Korean calligraphers
12th-century Korean philosophers
12th-century Korean poets
Goryeo Buddhists
Korean Confucianists
Korean politicians